Andrew Zawacki (May 22, 1972) is an American poet, critic, editor, and translator. He was a 2016 Howard Foundation Fellow in Poetry.

Zawacki's first book, By Reason of Breakings, won the 2001 University of Georgia Contemporary Poetry Series, chosen by Forrest Gander.

Work from his second book, Anabranch, was awarded the 2002 Cecil Hemley Memorial Award from the Poetry Society of America.  The volume also includes his 2001 chapbook Masquerade, selected by C.D. Wright to receive the 2002 Alice Fay Di Castagnola Award.

"Georgia," a long poem opening Zawacki's third book, Petals of Zero Petals of One, won the 1913 Prize and was published in 1913: a journal of forms, with short introductions by Peter Gizzi and Cole Swensen.

He has held fellowships from the Collège International des Traducteurs Littéraires and the Résidence internationale Ville de Paris / Institut Français aux Récollets in France, the Bogliasco Foundation in Italy, Hawthornden Castle in Scotland, Le Château de Lavigny in Switzerland, the Salzburg Seminar in American Studies in Austria, the University of Paris IV—La Sorbonne in France, the Slovenian Writers' Association in Slovenia, the Millay Colony, the Saltonstall Colony, and the Bread Loaf Writers' Conference.

Zawacki coedited the international literary magazine Verse with Brian Henry from 1995 through 2019. A Distinguished Research Professor of English, Zawacki has taught at the University of Georgia since 2005.

Life and work
Zawacki was educated at the College of William and Mary and, as a Rhodes Scholar, at the University of Oxford and the University of St Andrews.  A former Fulbright Scholar to Australia, he earned his Ph.D. from the Committee on Social Thought at the University of Chicago. Zawacki is a member of Alpha Phi Alpha fraternity.

Along with Andrew Joron, Zawacki is the literary co-executor of poet, novelist, and essayist Gustaf Sobin.

Zawacki's essays and reviews have appeared in national and international journals, among them the Times Literary Supplement, Boston Review, Chicago Review, How2, Open Letter, Australian Book Review, New German Critique, P.N. Review, and elsewhere.  He edited Afterwards: Slovenian Writing 1945-1995, the first comprehensive anthology of Slovenian poetry, fiction, and non-fiction to appear in the US, as well as editing and co-translating Aleš Debeljak's new and selected poems, Without Anesthesia (Persea Books, 2011).

He is also the translator, from the French, of poet and psychoanalyst Sébastien Smirou's books See About: Bestiary (La Presse / Fence (magazine), 2017) and My Lorenzo, published in 2012 by Burning Deck with an introduction by Jennifer Moxley. Zawacki has earned translation fellowships from the National Endowment for the Arts, the Centre National du Livre, and French Voices, and has also translated Abdellatif Laâbi, Philippe Soupault, and Anne Portugal.

Translated into French by Sika Fakambi, Georgia was published in France in 2009 by Éditions de l'Attente, who also brought out Carnet Bartleby, in Fakambi's translation, in 2012.  The French edition of Zawacki's first book, Par Raison de brisants, translated by Antoine Cazé, was issued by Éditions Grèges in 2011 and was a finalist for Le Prix Nelly Sachs. Translated by Anne Portugal, Sonnetssonnants appeared in a bilingual edition in the Collection américaine from Joca Seria.

He is of Polish descent.

Bibliography
Full-length Poetry Volumes

By Reason of Breakings (University of Georgia Press, 2002)
Anabranch (Wesleyan University Press, 2004)
Petals of Zero Petals of One (Talisman House, 2009)
Videotape (Counterpath Press, 2013)
Unsun : f/11 (Coach House Books, 2019)

Chapbooks

Masquerade (Vagabond Press, 2001)
Bartleby's Waste-book (PS Books, 2009)
Videotape (Particular Press, 2009)
Lumièrethèque (Blue Hour Press, 2009)
Roche limit (tir aux pigeons, 2010)
Glassscape (Projective Industries, 2010)
Georgia (Scary Topiary / Katalanché, 2013)
Four Poets, edited by Barbara Claire Freeman, alongside Brenda Hillman, Joshua Marie Wilkinson, and Brett Fletcher Lauer (Minus A, 2015)
Arrow's shadow (Equipage, 2017)
Sonnensonnets (Tammy, 2019)
Waterfall plot (Greying Ghost, 2019)

Edited Volumes

Afterwards: Slovenian Writing 1945-1995 (White Pine, 1999)
Miracle of Measure Ascendant: A Festschrift for Gustaf Sobin (Talisman House, 2005), co-edited with Andrew Joron
The Verse Book of Interviews: 27 Poets On Language, Craft & Culture (Verse, 2005), co-edited with Brian Henry
Collected Poems of Gustaf Sobin (Talisman House, 2010), co-edited with Edward Foster, Andrew Joron, and Esther Sobin
Without Anesthesia: New and Selected Poems of Aleš Debeljak (Persea Books, 2011)

Translated Books

Without Anesthesia: New and Selected Poems of Aleš Debeljak (Persea Books, 2011)
My Lorenzo by Sébastien Smirou (Burning Deck, 2012)
See About: Bestiary by Sébastien Smirou (La Presse / Fence Books, 2017)

Notes

External links
 Author Page: Andrew Zawacki > Wave Books

1972 births
Living people
21st-century American poets
Alumni of University College, Oxford
Alumni of the University of St Andrews
American Rhodes Scholars
College of William & Mary alumni
University of Chicago alumni
American people of Polish descent